Otoraplin is a protein that in humans is encoded by the OTOR gene.

The protein encoded by this gene is secreted via the Golgi apparatus and may function in cartilage development and maintenance. A frequent polymorphism in the translation start codon of this gene can abolish translation and may be associated with forms of deafness. This gene is a member of the melanoma-inhibiting activity gene family. In addition, alternate polyA sites exist for this gene.

References

Further reading